Lalín is a surname. Notable people with the surname include:
Allan Lalín (born 1981), Honduran footballer
Daniel Lalín, Argentine businessman
Matilde Lalín, Argentine-Canadian mathematician
Wilson Lalín (born 1985), Guatemalan footballer

See also
Lars Lalin (1729–1785), Swedish musician, playwright and opera singer
Lalín, a municipality in Spain
Lalin (disambiguation)